The Wigan Warriors play Rugby League in Wigan, England. Their 2018 season results in the Super League XXIII and 2018 Challenge Cup are shown below.

Super League

Wigan generally kept to consistent good form throughout the 2018 league season. They won all seven Super 8s games and sixteen out of twenty-three in regular season. The Warriors went on to finish the season second.

Regular season

Matches

Table

Super 8s

Matches

Table

Grand Final Playoffs
Wigan finished second in the league, qualifying them for the Grand Final Playoffs. Wigan beat Castleford Tigers in the semifinals before beating Warrington Wolves, who had knocked them out of the Challenge Cup in the summer, to claim their fifth Grand Final championship.

Challenge Cup

As a 2017 Super League Super 8s team, Wigan Warriors entered the 2018 Challenge Cup in the sixth round and were drawn against Hull KR. Wigan beat Hull KR and progress to the quarterfinals where they were knocked out by Warrington Wolves.

Transfers

In

Out

Loans Out

Squad

Notes

References

Wigan Warriors seasons
2018 in English rugby league